Glenn R. Keeney (May 6, 1942 – November 18, 2021) was an American martial artist. He was born to Walter Russell and Lucy Puckett Keeney in Anderson, Indiana in 1942, and began his karate training in 1957.

Early influences
In 1957, finding no local martial arts schools for training, he hitchhiked 115 miles from Anderson to the nearest karate school (a Taekwondo dojang) in Cincinnati, Ohio. He later found a school in Indianapolis, but the school closed the same year it opened.

Keeney began his study of Okinawan Goju Ryu in 1964, after meeting Larry Pickel in Anderson. Pickel, a black belt under Eiichi Miyazato had studied in Okinawa while in the US Marine corps. Keeney studied under Pickel until 1967 when Jerry Brown, Glenn Keeney and Larry Davenport, the top 3 students, were offered the opportunity to purchase the school. By 1969, Keeney had become the sole owner of Komakai Academy, which he ran until 2005.  Brown and Davenport stayed on at the school for many years.

Bill Wallace, who would later become the Professional Karate Association World Middleweight Champion, was attending Ball State University at that time. Although he chose not to adopt the Goju Ryu system,  Wallace and Keeney sparred several days a week and attended over 200 tournaments together over the next 5 years.  Bill Wallace credits a lot of his sparring savvy to these early workouts with Glenn Keeney.

Competitor 

Glenn Keeney, an active competitor from 1967-1975, competed in more than 300 tournaments. Glenn defeated many of the nation’s best fighters such as Bill Wallace, Artis Simmons, Walt Bone, Johnny Castaldo, Woodrow Fairbanks, Parker Shelton, Ken Knudson, Flem Evans.
As a member of the 1971/1972 USKA World Champion Team,  he traveled throughout Europe and Asia
on two Good Will Tours. The 1971-72 Team went undefeated both years. In 2012 he was inducted into "Madison County's 100 Greatest Athletes".

Tournament Promoter/Entrepreneur 
Keeney held his first karate tournament in 1968, and went on to host the 1970 & 1971 United States Karate Association Grand National Championships in Anderson, Indiana (the largest USKA tournament promoted to that date). He was voted Best tournament promoter by the USKA 4 years running. He co-hosted the 1975 Top Ten Nationals in Anderson, Indiana with Mike Anderson of Professional Karate Magazine, again with great success. In 1980, he promoted the PKA, CBS televised Bill Wallace retirement fight in Anderson, and was subsequently presented with the "Key to the City" by Mayor McMahon. Working again with the PKA and ESPN he went on to promote the 1981/82 PKA Nationals. He continues as an active promoter, hosting the Professional Karate Commission’s International Karate Championships each year in Indianapolis, Indiana.  

As an administrator, Keeney assisted in writing the USKA rule book for tournament competition. He functioned as Rules Chairman for 10 years. For several years he headed up the ratings committee for the PKA, and at the First Los Angeles World Championships in 1974 he participated as a judge.

Founder 
Mr. Keeney founded the (PKC) Professional Karate Commission in 1986. It began as a sanctioning body for Full Contact Kickboxing.  Upon the death of Grand Master Robert A. Trias in 1989, Keeney further developed the Professional Karate Commission as a membership organization and sanctioning body to include sport karate competition and dedicated the organization to the preservation of the principles, ethics, & integrity of Karate-Do.

Grand Master Glenn R. Keeney currently holds the rank of 10th dan, Hanshi of Okinawan Goju-ryu, and is ranked in Judo and Ju-Jitsu. His devotion to karate is held in high regard by both peers and students alike.  Although he is semi-retired, as of 2013 he still teaches seminars and clinics.

Notable Awards and Honors 
 Trias International Society - Inducted by Robert A. Trias, Father of American Karate
 Black Belt Magazine – Hall of Fame 1977, inducted as Instructor of the Year
 Black Belt Magazine – Rated #4 as a Top Ten Fighter in the U.S. 1972
 USKA #1 Rated Fighter 1972-73
 1980 Presented “Key to the City of Anderson” by Mayor McMahon of Anderson, Indiana
 2012 Inductee "Madison County's 100 Greatest Athletes" Published by Anderson Herald Bulletin

Most Noted Student 
Ross Scott-Professional Karate Association (PKA) World Heavyweight Full Contact Kickboxing Champion 1977 and 1980 (defeats Joe Lewis in a non-title bout 1975)

Personal life and death 
Keeney died on November 18, 2021, at the age of 79. He was survived by his wife of 36 years, Marsha Keeney, and his three daughters, Beth Ann, Glenna, and Sholin. He also had seven grandchildren and four great grandchildren.

References

Further reading
 John Corcoran and Emil Farkas (1977) The Complete Martial Arts Catalogue.  Simon & Schuster, 95 p.
 John Corcoran and Emil Farkas (1993)  The Original Martial Arts Encyclopedia: Traditions, History, Pioneers. Pro-Action Publishing, Los Angeles, 264, 268, 337, 392, 407 p.
 Al and David Weiss (1997) The Official History of Karate in America: The Golden Age 1968-1986. Pro-Action Publishing, Los Angeles, 28, 64, 125, 159 p.
 Robert A. Trias (1980) The Pinnacle of Karate: Methods of Okinawan Shuri-ryu. Privately published, Phoenix.  132, 336, 348 p.
 Robert A. Trias (1983) The Supreme Way: Philosophy of Karatedo. Methods of Shuri-ryu. Privately published, Phoenix, 40, 238 p.
 James A. Jones (2010) The Path to Knowledge in Martial Arts. Privately published, Hazelcrest IL.  211, 215 p.
 Richard Zimmerman, "Black Belt Hall of Fame 1977” Black Belt Magazine Jan 1978: 23. Print.
 Joyce Yarnall, "Simmons, Keeney Clash in Midwest Karate Match” Black Belt Magazine Apr 1970: 60. P.
 Joyce Yarnall, "Gateway Open Honors Memory of Jim Chapman” Black Belt Magazine Apr 1972: 52, 53. P.
 Jim Norris, "Annual AKA Tourney Pits Wallace vs Keeney” Black Belt Magazine Feb 1971: 53. P.
 Joyce Yarnall, "Artis Simmons Retires from Competition” Black Belt Magazine Dec 1970: 11. P.
 Joyce Yarnall, "Bill Wallace nabs Joe Lewis at the USKK Grand Natl Championships” Black Belt Magazine Dec 1970: 30, 32. P.
 "Top 10 Karatemen in the United States” Black Belt Magazine Oct 1972: 42. P.
 Massad Ayoob, "The Dollar and sense of Pro Karate” Black Belt Magazine Apr 1975: 32. P.
 Rick Shively, “Taking Karate to America’s Breadbasket, Glenn Keeney proved that Small town,  USA is interested in the martial arts” Black Belt Magazine Dec 1976: 41-44. P.
 Glenn Keeney, "Tales of American Karate, The Hard-Hitting Hoosier”  Black Belt Magazine Jan  1993: 92. P.
 Joyce Yarnall, "Keeney Wins High-Scoring Bout For Spring Olympics Grand Title” Black Belt Magazine Sep 1972: 56-57. P.
 “Tourneys” Black Belt Magazine Feb 1975: 60 P.
 Joel B. Ward / Ben Peacock, “Favorite Fighting Techniques Of Glenn Keeney” Official Karate Magazine Oct 1973: P.
 “Karate’s my Game, Keeney’s my Name” Karate Illustrated Magazine Nov 1976: 15. P.
 Bob Wall (2003)  Who’s Who in the Martial Arts. R.A. Wall Investments, Inc: P.
 Bill Wallace, “Wrestling with the Kickboxing Dilemma” Black Belt Magazine Oct 1989: 12 p.
 Anderson Herald Bulletin (2012) “Madison County's 100 Greatest Athletes” Anderson Herald Bulletin: 76, 103. P.

External links 
 The Professional Karate Commission
 Glenn Keeney - President PKC

1942 births
2021 deaths
Martial arts school founders
People from Anderson, Indiana